The 1996 Montana gubernatorial election took place on November 5, 1996. Incumbent Governor of Montana Marc Racicot, who was first elected in 1992, ran for re-election. After winning the Republican primary against a conservative activist, he moved on to the general election, where he was set to face Chet Blaylock, a former State Senator and the Democratic nominee. However, on October 23, 1996, Blaylock died of a heart attack, and the Montana Democratic Party selected his running mate, State Senator Judy Jacobson, to replace him as the gubernatorial nominee, and she therefore appeared on the ballot as both the gubernatorial nominee and the lieutenant gubernatorial nominee. Ultimately, however, Racicot was able to defeat Jacobson in a landslide to win re-election to his second and final term as governor. , this was last time a Republican candidate carried every county in the state  and the last time a Republican was re-elected governor.

Democratic primary

Candidates
 Chet Blaylock, former State Senator
 Bob Kelleher, perennial candidate

Results

Republican primary

Candidates
 Marc Racicot, incumbent Governor of Montana
 Rob Natelson, conservative activist and constitutional law professor

Results

General election

Results

References

Montana
Gubernatorial
1996